Adelpherupa costipunctalis is a moth in the family Crambidae. It was described by Koen V. N. Maes in 2002. It is found in Malawi.

The larvae feed on Oryza species.

References

Moths described in 2002
Schoenobiinae
Moths of Africa